Yassine Benhattab (born 18 November 2002) is a French professional footballer who plays as a midfielder for Aubagne.

Professional career
Benhattab made his professional debut with Niort in a 1-0 Ligue 2 loss to Troyes AC on 18 December 2020.

References

External links
 
 Chamois Niortais Profile

2002 births
Footballers from Marseille
French sportspeople of Algerian descent
Living people
French footballers
Association football midfielders
Chamois Niortais F.C. players
Aubagne FC players
Ligue 2 players
Championnat National 2 players
Championnat National 3 players